Club Deportivo El Álamo is a football team based in El Álamo in the autonomous Community of Madrid, Spain. Founded in 1974, it plays in the Tercera División Group 7, holding home matches at Estadio Facundo Rivas, which has a capacity of 1,500 spectators.

It has played several seasons in the Tercera División; last time it finished 15th in the 2019-20 season.

Season to season

8 seasons in Tercera División

Ground 
El Álamo's home ground is Estadio Facundo Rivas with a capacity of 1,500 seats.

Notable players
 Óscar (2010~) 
  Dani Evuy (2007~2008)
 Rubén Anuarbe (1999~2001)

References

External links
Official website
futmadrid.com profile

Football clubs in the Community of Madrid
Divisiones Regionales de Fútbol clubs
Association football clubs established in 1974
1974 establishments in Spain